Two institutions grant the Fastenrath Awards: Fundación Premio Fastenrath  awards writers of Spanish nationality and their Spanish works and Premi Fastenrath for Catalan works. Both were instituted with the posthumous legacy of Johannes Fastenrath Hürxthal.

Background
Luise Goldmann (1858-1914), widow of the publicist and hispanophilian Johannes Fastenrath Hurxthal (Remscheid , 1839 - Cologne, 1908), at the death of her husband, who occurred in Cologne, on March 18, 1908, wanted to institute with her legacy a series of actions in favor of writers in Spanish and Catalan, having two foundations:

a. For the «Fastenrath Prize», with a founding capital of 70,000 pts. (in 1908), he conferred on King Alfonso XIII the power to proceed in the best way he considered, always under a foundation that instituted a prize for Spanish writers, with the requirement that he be named Juan Fastenrath as tribute.

b. For the "Premi Fastenrath", with a foundational capital of 14,000 pts. (in 1908), he gave the City Council of Barcelona the power to proceed in the best way he considered, instituting an award at the Floral Games in Barcelona, a literary institution closely linked with her and her late husband, with the requirement of to bear the name of Juan Fastenrath as a tribute.

Fundación Premio Fastenrath (1909-2003)

History
Luise Goldmann addressed a letter to King Alfonso XIII to show the founding objective of the institution and the means it has for the economic support of the same.

In order to carry out Luise Goldmann's task, King Alfonso XIII constituted the Fastenrath Prize Foundation, on May 12, 1909, dependent on the Royal House, with a founding capital of 70,000 pts., assigning to the Spanish Royal Academy the administration of the foundation, and therefore, the faculty to submit to the monarch the proposals for the awarding of said prizes, after discussion and voting, being the monarch the one who would ultimately grant them.

In June 1935, the Fundación Premio Fastenrath became dependent on the Ministry of Public Education and Fine Arts and in September 1935 it was declared "a private charity", under the protectorate of the Government of the Republic, and administrated by the then Spanish Academy.

In a similar way to the Fastenrath Prize Foundation, the Royal Spanish Academy has been administering, on the basis of legacies instituted by individuals or private funds, a series of foundations with similar prize objectives. In mid-November 2003, it merged eleven of its dependent foundations, one of which is the "Fundación Premio Fastenrath", to form the Fundación Premios Real Academia Española.

Organization
The prize was awarded annually. It was always awarded to a work, in the Spanish language and carried out by writers of Spanish nationality, of literary or scientific creation, with the requirement that it had been published previously. Initially, the work submitted should have been published in the same year as the competition, but when it was split up and awarded in successive rounds in various forms, up to five, the number of years preceding publication also changed, so that all published works had the same opportunity to be submitted and awarded, regardless of the form of the award. In the case of the plays, in the first specific calls for entries, they had to have been premiered beforehand, a requirement that was later changed.
Therefore, for the "Fastenrath Prize", the last call was for the "Fastenrath Prize 2002", awarded in 2003. The economic amount of the prize came from the income of the instituted legacy, and varied over time, from 2,000 pts. (1909-1946), 4,000 pts (1947-?), 8,000 pts. (1955, 1958), 5,000 pts. (1963), 6,000 pts (1956-1957, 1959–1962, 1964–1991), 500,000 pts (1992-1998), to 2,000,000 pts or the equivalent of €12,020  (1999-2002). It can be seen that the maintenance of the same economic endowment without any increase, twice over extremely long periods of up to thirty-five years, gave the prize during those years a value more symbolic and testimonial than real, and contributed only because it was considered the dean of the prizes for writers in the Spanish language.

Calls and awards "Fundación Premio Fastenrath" (1909-2003)

Premi Fastenrath (1909-1983)

History and organization
The Fastenrath couple's connection with the Barcelona Floral Games ("Jocs Florals de Barcelona") was close and long-lasting. Fastenrath's passion for the Hispanic world and its literature led him to move some of the literary traditions of Hispanic culture, and particularly Catalan culture, to Cologne, the German city where he lived. Thus, in 1898, he established in Cologne some floral games (1898-1914), in imitation of the Barcelona Floral Games (1859- ), which he personally directed until his death and his widow continued, until her subsequent death in 1914. Luise Goldmann, who always maintained her husband's interests and memory, had already been appointed Queen of the Barcelona Floral Games in 1889.

So, in order to carry out Luisa Goldmann's task, Barcelona City Council arranged for the creation of the Premi Fastenrath, with the income from municipal debt securities acquired with the founding capital provided, and assigned the administration and organisation of the prizes to the Consistori dels Jocs Florals de Barcelona, in accordance with regulations approved by the plenary session of the municipal corporation in November 1908.

The annual calls were always made by awarding a single prize, which rotated in triennial cycles between three modalities, novel, poetry and dramatic work. The first call for entries for the "Premi Fastenrath" was in 1909, and it remained in force until 1936, during the entire period in which the Barcelona Floral Games were held, before they were interrupted by the Spanish Civil War.

During the period 1941–1977, in which the celebrations of the Catalan language were suspended by the municipal institutions, and the floral games were held in Barcelona in a private way, the "Premi Fastenrath" was called by the organization of the "Jocs Florals de la Llengua Catalana", which kept the annual celebrations in an itinerant way in different cities of the world. In this period the prize money will be given away in various currencies depending on the edition, such as Mexican pesos or dollars.

Once the "Jocs Florals de Barcelona" were officially reinstated by the Barcelona City Council, during a first stage (1978-1983) the inherited prize system was maintained. Later, in a second stage (1984-2005), the system will be reduced and only the three awards with which the Barcelona Floral Games began in 1859 will be maintained, only the exclusively poetic awards ("Englantina", "Viola" and "Flor natural"), so the "Premi Fastenrath" will disappear; and from 2006, only one poetry award will be granted, the "Premi de Poesia Jocs Florals de Barcelona".

Premi Fastenrath winners

Barcelona Floral Games (1909-1936)

Catalan Language Floral Games (1941-1977)

Barcelona Floral Games (1978-1983)

References

Notes

Spanish-language literary awards
Spanish literary awards
Awards established in 1909
1909 establishments in Spain